"" is a Lutheran hymn by Justus Jonas, a paraphrase of Psalm 124 in eight stanzas. It was first published in 1524 in the Erfurt Enchiridion. The theme of the psalm is the need of help against raging enemies. It has been translated also as "Where the Lord God does not stand (stay) with us", "If God the Lord is not with us", "If God the Lord is not on our side", among others.

History 

Jonas wrote the hymn on a request by Martin Luther in 1524. He combined the ideas of Psalm 124 with passages from Psalm 12 and other Biblical motifs. The text was first published in the Erfurt Enchiridion, a hymnal of 26 songs including 18 by Luther, "Es ist das Heil uns kommen her" and other hymns by Paul Speratus, "" by Elisabeth Cruciger, and others.

Luther himself published his own paraphrase of Psalm 124 in three stanzas, ". The current German Protestant hymnal  has as EG 297 a combination of Jonas' stanzas 1, 2, 5 and 6, and Luther's 2 and 3 (as 3 and 4).

Music 

A hymn tune for Jonas's hymn was published in 1525 in Zwickau (Zahn No. 4440).  published two melodies for the hymn in the 1535 edition of his hymnal: Zahn Nos. 4441a and 4442. Another hymn tune, Zahn No. 4443, was published in Leipzig, in Ernst Vögelin's  of 1563.

The hymn is the base for several compositions. An early four-part setting was written by Johann Walter. Johann Sebastian Bach composed a chorale cantata, BWV 178, based on Jonas's hymn and the Zahn 4441a tune, the eighth cantata of his second annual cycle, first performed on 30 July 1724. He also wrote a chorale fantasia, BWV 1128, believed to date from between 1705 and 1710, which was discovered in 2008. Chorale preludes were written by Johann Christoph Bach and Johann Pachelbel, vocal works were composed by Michael Altenburg, Christoph Graupner, Johann Hermann Schein and Heinrich Schütz, among others.

References

External links 

1524 works
16th-century hymns in German
Lutheran hymns based on Psalms
Hymn tunes